CHOZ-FM is a Canadian radio station based in St. John's, Newfoundland and Labrador. Its main St. John's transmitter broadcasts at 94.7 MHz, with additional transmitters located throughout the island. The station, known as OZFM, is one of the various media properties of the Stirling family; this includes local television station CJON-DT.

History
CHOZ launched on June 15, 1977 at 93.9 FM, soon after Geoff Stirling sold his interest in what is now CJYQ. It was originally a full-time rock station known as Radio OZ, The Rock Of The Rock. It eventually transitioned into a CHR/Classic Rock hybrid fusion type format under the OZFM brand; nonetheless it kept "The Rock Of The Rock" slogan.

On August 1, 1984, CHOZ was approved to move to 94.7 FM.

The station's success was driven largely by the strength of its morning show, The Dawn Patrol, hosted by Randy Snow, Deborah Birmingham and Larry Jay.

In the summer of 2003, Snow left the Dawn Patrol to join CKIX-FM to host his own morning show. His replacement was Brian O'Connell, who left the VOCM to join CHOZ.

By 2004, CHOZ began shifting towards hot adult contemporary, with slogans like "More Music, More Variety" and "Newfoundland's #1 FM Station".

In April 2007, O'Connell took over as station manager for the OZFM Network and host of the daily Electric Lunch program. Then, O'Connell left CHOZ and now works with Stingray Radio. Paul Kinsman was O'Connell's on air replacement, joining longtime Dawn Patrol veterans Birmingham and Jay.

On August 17, 2009, CHOZ changed its format to active rock.

On January 2, 2012, CHOZ flipped back to hot AC, with a new slogan "Today's Best Music". This ended the use of their longtime slogan "The Rock of the Rock". The station also resurrected their longtime heart-rainbow logo that was used from the late 1980s to 2007. The following month, the station surfaced on the Mediabase Canadian hot AC panel.

In August 2012, Kinsman and Jay left the Dawn Patrol, which was renamed The Morning Rush and featured a new host, Robert Shawn, alongside the only remaining original host Birmingham. In January 2013, the pair were joined by their former behind the scenes producer, Laura Woodworth. Birmingham left the station in January 2014 and her replacement on the Morning Rush was Stephanie O'Brien, previously with VOCM-FM. Woodworth left the station in November 2014.

In July 2015, Shawn switched shifts with Stephen Lethbridge. The Morning Rush was then renamed The OZFM Rush. In December of the same year, Weekend announcer Hugh Campbell joined the Rush. In December 2016, O'Brien went on maternity leave. Shannell Lewis co-hosted the Rush until O'Brien returned in February 2018.

On August 26, 2019, Snow returned to CHOZ after 16 years with CKIX-FM, As a result, the OZFM Rush became The Morning Jam with Snow joining O'Brien as the new host, replacing Lethbridge and Campbell. In addition, CHOZ tweaked its format to playing a mix of hits from the 1990s to today, much like many hot AC stations. The station previously had a top 40-leaning playlist. CHOZ became known as Newfoundland’s Music Mix, The New OZFM. In May 2020, the station started to drop the "new" from their moniker. By August 2020, the "new" was removed completely.

Controversy
In January 2011, the Canadian Broadcast Standards Council admonished CHOZ for playing the unedited version of Dire Straits' "Money for Nothing", following a complaint from a listener that stated that the song contained the word "faggot", a slur for a homosexual person. Even though the song has won numerous awards and has been played countless times on Canadian radio, the CBSC felt that the unedited version has become unacceptable for airplay, as the term "faggot", which was once an acceptable term, has since become an unacceptable slur. In response to the ruling, at least two stations, CIRK-FM in Edmonton, Alberta and CFRQ-FM in Halifax, Nova Scotia, played the unedited version of Money for Nothing repeatedly for one hour out of protest. On January 21, 2011, the CRTC asked the CBSC for a review on the ban, in response to the public outcry against the CBSC's actions; the regulator requested the CBSC to appoint a nationwide panel to review the case, as the decision on the ban was reviewed by a regional panel for the Maritimes and Newfoundland.

On August 31, the CBSC found the slur to be inappropriate; however, due to considerations in regard to its use in context, the CBSC has left it up to the stations to decide whether or not to censor the song. Most of the CBSC panelists thought the slur was inappropriate, but it was used only in a satirical, non-hateful manner.

Transmitters

CJMY and CKMY were previously known as CKCV-FM and CHOS-FM respectively, up to at least 2002.  The changes were apparently made to reserve appropriate call signs for My FM, Newfoundland Broadcasting's proposal for a second FM service, which went before the CRTC later that same year. (The licence in question eventually went to a different company as CKSJ-FM.)

In 1997, CHOZ added a rebroadcaster at Stockholm, Saskatchewan with the callsign CFZY-FM; the low-powered repeater is locally owned by Jody Herperger. The station was decommissioned in 2007.

In 1998, CHOZ added a rebroadcaster at Kuujjuaq, Quebec with the callsign VF2321, owned by Société Kuujjuamiut.

On November 30, 2012, the stations rebroadcaster at Red Rocks, CKSS-FM 96.9 had closed. This transmitter served the Port aux Basques area. The station has cited the age of the tower and the costs of the upkeep. CHOZ, however, announced plans to reactivate it from another location, pending approval from the CRTC. As of 2018, CRTC approval has never been granted. CHOZ also originally planned to also temporarily close CIOS on the same day, but had second thoughts in doing so, and opted to keep it open from the same location instead.  The application to move the CIOS transmitter to a new location has been approved on November 8, 2013.

On September 15, 2015, the CRTC approved a new transmitter for a new CHOZ rebroadcaster in Gander, CFAZ-FM 97.7, with an effective radiated power (ERP) of 2,800 watts (effective height of antenna above average terrain of 137.4 metres).  The new transmitter would resolve coverage problems within the Gander area from its Grand Falls-Windsor outlet CKMY, which offered fringe reception in Gander. CFAZ began broadcasting on August 9, 2016.

CHOZ is simulcast across Canada on Bell Satellite TV channel 951, locally on Rogers Cable channel 925, and in the St. John's area on subchannel 21.2 of CJON-DT.

References

External links
 OZFM
 
 

Hoz
Hoz